Sēļi Parish is an administrative territorial entity of Valmiera Municipality in the Vidzeme region of Latvia. Prior to 2009, it was an administrative unit of the former Valmiera District. The administrative center is Sēļi village.

Towns, villages and settlements of Sēļi Parish 
 Idus
 Pantene
 Pilāti
  – parish administrative center

References

External links

Parishes of Latvia
Valmiera Municipality
Vidzeme